is a railway station in Toshima, Tokyo, Japan, operated by the East Japan Railway Company (JR East) and Toei Subway.

Lines
Sugamo Station is served by the following two lines.
 Yamanote Line
 Toei Mita Line

Station layout
Platform edge doors were installed on the Yamanote Line platforms during fiscal 2013.

JR East platforms

Toei platforms

History
The station opened on 1 April 1903.

Station numbering was introduced in 2016 with Sugamo being assigned station number JY11.

Passenger statistics
In fiscal 2013, the JR East station was used by an average of 77,089 passengers daily (boarding passengers only), making it the 57th-busiest station operated by JR East. In fiscal 2013, the Toei station was used by an average of 46,241 passengers daily (boarding passengers only). The daily average passenger figures (boarding passengers only) for JR East in previous years are as shown below.

Surrounding area
To the north of the station is a long shopping street, which is popular with older ladies, and the area is known as "Harajuku for Grannies".

See also

 List of railway stations in Japan

References

External links

 JR East station information 
 Toei station information 

Railway stations in Japan opened in 1903
Yamanote Line
Toei Mita Line
Stations of East Japan Railway Company
Stations of Tokyo Metropolitan Bureau of Transportation
Railway stations in Tokyo